Veja is a French footwear and accessories brand. In Brazil the brand goes by the name of Vert due to name similarities with the magazine Veja. As of October 2018, Veja supplied its shoes to 1,800 retailers in 45 countries. They sold 550,000 pairs of shoes, generating $21 million in revenues in 2017. In 2020, Veja employed between 180 and 190 people.

History

Founding (2003) 
Veja was founded in 2004. Veja's founders Sébastien Kopp and François-Ghislain Morillion met with organic cotton farmers in North Brazil and wild rubber tappers in the Amazon (Seringueiros) to establish the production chain behind Veja in Brazil.

2004–2011: business expansion 
In February 2005, the company made its first official launch at the Palais de Tokyo, Paris. Growing its influence, the company collaborated with French fashion designer Agnès b. In 2006, the company developed their first collection using vegetable-tanned leather, and has since began curating the photography exhibition Novo Mundo(S) at Wanted Gallery, Paris.

In 2007, the company began its collaboration with French label Comptoir des Cotonniers, launching its first collaborated product Veja + Christine Phung collection at the Pompidou Centre Design Shop in Paris. The business began expanding into the children's trainer scene, with the launch of Veja small.

In 2008, the company began its expansion to London, opening its studio there. Through time, the company has released a wide variety of different products and styles, ensuing talks of collaborations with third party organisations.

2012–present 
Seeing record moves of progress, the company began its new wave of collaborations, beginning with Regina Dabdab. In 2013, the company released a capsule collection of printed trainers, inspired by professor Greg Asner's aerial maps recording forest cover and biodiversity in tropical forest ecosystems. With the launch of the film Once upon a Forest, by French director Luc Jacquet, Veja commemorated its launch by releasing a custom trainer.

In October 2018, the Duchess of Sussex, Meghan Markle wore a pair of Veja sneakers to watch an Invictus Games sailing event during the official tour she took through Australia, New Zealand and Fiji with her spouse Prince Harry.

In 2019 the brand launched a collaborations with Rick Owens, Madewell and Lemaire.

Materials 
Veja trainers and accessories are made of organic cotton, wild rubber from the Amazon, vegetable-tanned leather, and recycled plastic bottles.

Organic cotton

Veja works in the North-East of Brazil with a co-operative of organic cotton farmers. Over 320 families have adopted the agro-ecology farming model with the technical support of the local NGO, ESPLAR. Cotton and food crops are cultivated without chemicals or artificial pesticides. Veja buys organic cotton at around twice the market price.

Vegetable-tanned leather

Since 2006 Veja has used vegetable-tanned leather. Vegetable-tanned leather is a chrome-free leather tanned with organic compounds only. Leather is usually tanned using heavy metals, like chrome, which generate high levels of pollution in the waters close to tanneries. Veja has replaced heavy metals with acacia extracts, a natural tannin.

Recycled plastic bottles 
Veja uses waterproof bottle mesh on the soles of sneakers. It takes three recycled plastic bottles to make a pair of shoes. Bottles are collected from the streets of São Paulo and Rio de Janeiro and are later crushed and transformed into fiber.

Social responsibility 
Veja claims ecological and fair trade conditions and to work with cooperatives of small producers and social associations in Brazil and France. However, Veja has not published any results of social audits for many years nor are there any certificates for the company's self-acclaimed fair-trade standards available.

Manufacturing 
The factory where Veja trainers are made in South Brazil respects the standards of work established by the International Labour Organization. 80% of workers at the factory are unionized.

Logistics 
Veja footwear and accessories are transported by ship from Brazil to Le Havre in France, where they are then taken to Paris by boat.

Logistics are managed by Ateliers Sans Frontières, a French social association which enables people who have been unemployed to return to the workforce through training.

Awards 
Veja wins two awards in the UK: The Guardian Sustainable Business Award (Supply Chain Category) and The Observer Ethical Award (Fashion Category, awarded in association with Vogue UK).

References

External links 

Shoe brands
Shoe companies of France
Fair trade brands
Companies based in Paris